The 58th Filmfare Awards were held honoring the best films of 2012 from the Hindi-language film industry (commonly known as Bollywood). The nominations were announced on 13 January 2013. The ceremony was held on 20 January 2013 at Yash Raj Studio, Mumbai. The event was hosted by Shah Rukh Khan and Saif Ali Khan for the sixth time. All the Filmfare Black Lady statuettes had gold-plated bottoms to celebrate 100 years of Indian Cinema. The Lifetime Achievement Award was awarded posthumously to Yash Chopra (collected by his wife, Pamela Chopra) by Karan Johar.

Barfi! led the ceremony with 12 nominations, followed by Vicky Donor with 8 nominations and Jab Tak Hai Jaan with 7 nominations.

Barfi! won 7 awards, including Best Film, Best Actor (for Ranbir Kapoor), Best Female Debut (for Ileana D'Cruz) and Best Music Director (for Pritam), thus becoming the most-awarded film at the ceremony.

Cousins Parineeti Chopra and Priyanka Chopra were nominated for Best Actress for their performances in Ishaqzaade and Barfi! respectively, but both lost to Vidya Balan who won the award for Kahaani.

Winners and nominees
The nominees for the 58th Filmfare Awards were announced on 13 January 2013.

Awards

Main Awards

Critics' Awards

Technical Awards

Multiple nominations

The following films received multiple nominations.
 12 nominations: Barfi!
 8 nominations: Vicky Donor
 7 nominations: Jab Tak Hai Jaan
 6 nominations: Gangs of Wasseypur, Kahaani
 5 nominations: Agneepath
 4 nominations: Cocktail, Student Of The Year
 3 nominations: English Vinglish, Ishaqzaade and Talaash: The Answer Lies Within
 2 nominations:  Paan Singh Tomar and Shanghai

The following films received multiple awards.
 7 wins: Barfi!
 5 wins: Kahaani
 4 wins: Gangs of Wasseypur and Vicky Donor
 2 wins: Jab Tak Hai Jaan and Paan Singh Tomar

Achievements
Sneha Khanwalkar became the second woman ever to be nominated for Best Music Director. Usha Khanna was the first woman to achieve this feat at the 31st Filmfare Awards in 1984.

See also
 Filmfare Awards

References

External links
 Filmfare Official Website

Filmfare Awards
2013 Indian film awards